The 10th National Geographic Bee was held in Washington, D.C. on May 20, 1998, sponsored by the National Geographic Society. The final competition was moderated by Jeopardy! host Alex Trebek. The winner was Petko Peev of Forest Hills Central Middle School in Grand Rapids, Michigan, who won a $25,000 college scholarship. The 2nd-place winner,  J. B. Kizer of Portsmouth, Ohio, won a $15,000 scholarship. The 3rd-place winner, Evan Sparks of Westminster Academy in Memphis, Tennessee, won a $10,000 scholarship.

References

External links
 National Geographic Bee Official Website

National Geographic Bee